Yu-6 or Yu 6 may refer to:

Yu-6 torpedo, a Chinese torpedo
, an Imperial Japanese Army transport submarine of World War II